Luís Infante de la Cerda Sttau Monteiro (April 3, 1926 – July 23, 1993) was a Portuguese writer, novelist and playwright, a man to whom "the only sacred thing was to be free as the wind".

Life
Monteiro was born and died in Lisbon, Portugal. When he was ten years old, he went to London, accompanying his father, Armindo Monteiro, who was serving as the Portuguese ambassador to the United Kingdom. He returned to Portugal in 1943, after his father was removed from his position by António Salazar.

He graduated from the University of Lisbon with a degree in law and worked as a lawyer for a short time. At this time he met his Future Wife , a British Lady JUNE ELIZABETH GOODYEAR and got married,  Subsequently, he returned to London, where he worked as a journalist. He came into contact with contemporary English literature and decided to become a writer. He also developed an interest in Formula 2 racing, a hobby that he would pursue for the rest of his life. 

When he went back to Portugal, he wrote for the magazine  (under the Name "Manuel Pedrosa") and A Mosca, a supplement of the Diário de Lisboa. In 1960, he published his first novel  Um Homem não Chora (A Man Doesn't Cry). In 1961, he received the Grand Prize from the Sociedade Portuguesa de Autores for his play Felizmente Há Luar! (Fortunately, There is Moonlight!), although it could not be performed due to the censorship laws.

As a result, he once again went to England and lived there until 1967. Upon his return, he was immediately arrested again, by PIDE (the internal security agency), on the grounds that he had written theatrical pieces satirizing Salazar and the Colonial War.

Following the Carnation Revolution (in 1974), some of his plays were presented for the first time by the D. Maria II National Theatre. He continued to contribute to periodicals, notably Expresso. He died of a cerebral hemorrhage at the age of sixty-seven.

Luis and June had 4 Children Carolina Goodyear de Sttau Monteiro, Ana Lucia Goodyear de Sttau Monteiro, Diogo Goodyear de Sttau Monteiro, Tomas Goodyear de Sttau Monteiro.

In 1994, he was posthumously awarded the Military Order of Saint James of the Sword.

Bibliography

Prose
Um Homem não Chora (1960)
Angústia para o Jantar (1961) In English: Rules of the Game (Knopf) or A Man of Means (Putnam); literally Anguish for Dinner, translated by Ann Stevens
E se for Rapariga Chama-se Custódia (1966)
Redacções da Guidinha (1971) 

Plays
Felizmente há Luar! (1961)
Todos os Anos, pela Primavera (1963)
O Barão (1965, theatrical adaptation of the novella by Branquinho da Fonseca)
Auto da Barca do Motor fora da Borda (1966)
A Guerra Santa (1967)
A Estátua (1967)
As Mãos de Abraão Zacut (1968)
Sua Excelência (1971)
Crónica Aventurosa do Esperançoso Fagundes (1979)

1926 births
1993 deaths
People from Lisbon
20th-century Portuguese dramatists and playwrights
Portuguese male novelists
20th-century Portuguese novelists
Portuguese male dramatists and playwrights
20th-century Portuguese male writers